This is a list of Spanish television related events in 1971.

Events
 3 April: Karina represents Spain at the Eurovision Song Contest 1971 hold in Dublin (Ireland) with the song En un mundo Nuevo, ranking 2nd with 116 points.

Debuts

La 1

Television shows

La 1

Ending this year

La 1

Foreign series debuts in Spain

La 1

Births
 14 January - Manel Fuentes, host.
 26 January - Màxim Huerta, host.
 5 March - Begoña Alegría, journalist.
 8 April - Cristina Medina, actress.
 10 April - Silvia Abril, actress and comedian.
 14 April - Gema López, journalist.
 7 May - Lola Baldrich, actress.
 7 May - Malena Gracia, showoman.
 6 June - Silvia Jato, hostess.
 8 June - Luis Fraga, host.
 19 June - Eva Isanta, actress.
 19 June - Nacho Fresneda, actor.
 21 June - Pedro Alonso, actor.
 30 June - Guillermo Ortega, actor.
 5 July - Roberto Vilar, host
 8 August - Jorge Fernández, host.
 15 August - María Patiño, journalist.
 29 August - Antonio Garrido, actor.
 29 August - Frank Cuesta, host
 23 September - Lara Dibildos, hostess.
 22 October - Mavi Doñate, journalist.
 4 December - Marta Jaumandreu, hostess.
 23 December - Daniel Albaladejo, actor.

See also
1971 in Spain
List of Spanish films of 1971

References 

1971 in Spanish television